Horace Willing Helmbold (August 27, 1867 – November 18, 1939) was a Major League Baseball pitcher who played in  with the Philadelphia Athletics.

Helmbold made his lone appearance on October 11 against the Syracuse Stars, pitching 7.0 innings and allowing 11 earned runs to earn the loss.

References

External links

Major League Baseball pitchers
Philadelphia Athletics (AA) players
1867 births
1939 deaths
Baseball players from Pennsylvania
19th-century baseball players
American cricketers
Philadelphian cricketers
Cricketers from Philadelphia